The Battle of Rancagua, also known in Chile as the Disaster of Rancagua, occurred on October 1, 1814, to October 2, 1814, when the Spanish Army under the command of Mariano Osorio defeated the rebel Chilean forces led by Bernardo O’Higgins. This put an end to the Chilean Patria Vieja and it was the decisive step of the Spanish military Reconquest of Chile.

Background
When Spain heard about the Patriot revolt in Chile, they sent an army of Spanish soldiers and royalists to defeat the rebellion. When O'Higgins heard about the besieged army in Rancagua, he went with his army of 1,000 patriots, to reinforce Juan Carrera's army in Rancagua. Outnumbered and with barely enough supplies, O'Higgins did not retreat and sealed the fate of his army.

The Battle
The battle occurred on the morning of October 1, 1814, outside the town of Rancagua. The Chilean forces had occupied the town prior to this confrontation and ultimately were surrounded by Osorio’s forces who advanced towards the town. The reason for occupying the town was its strategic importance in the defense of the Chilean capital, Santiago. The battle was fierce and the Spanish had an elite force of soldiers known as “Talaveras” who were veterans from the Napoleonic Wars in Europe. As the fighting continued onward to the evening, the Spanish forces decided to set fire to the town. With casualties growing, the Chilean forces requested reinforcements from the capital city of Santiago, which was 87 Kilometers north of Rancagua. Ultimately the request failed, which forced the Chilean army to disperse and flee to the countryside and wilderness. After this victory, the Spanish army continued on to Santiago, crushed the Chilean Government and instituted their brutal Reconquista of Chile.

Aftermath
After the Battle of Rancagua, the Spanish captured Santiago within a few days, which marked the beginning of the Reconquista of South America. This battle became a stain on Chile's national memory as it was a time when the nation was lost and the people feared that their struggle for independence was in vain. The people fled elsewhere in South America as refugees to escape the violence the Spanish would have meted out to the rebels.

See also 
 Chilean War of Independence

References

Conflicts in 1814
Battles involving Chile
Battles involving Spain
Battles of the Spanish American wars of independence
Battles of the Chilean War of Independence
Battles of the Patria Vieja Campaign
1814 in the Captaincy General of Chile
Battle of Rancagua
Battle of Rancagua
October 1814 events